Gabriel Díaz Vara y Calderón (1621–1676) was a Roman Catholic prelate who served as Bishop of Santiago de Cuba (1671–1676).

Biography
Gabriel Díaz Vara y Calderón was born in Madrid, Spain in 1621.
On 14 Dec 1671, he was appointed during the papacy of Pope Clement X as Bishop of Santiago de Cuba.
On 4 Sep 1672, he was consecrated bishop by Ambrosio Ignacio Spínola y Guzman, Archbishop of Seville. 
He served as Bishop of Santiago de Cuba until his death on 13 Mar 1676.

References

External links and additional sources
 (for Chronology of Bishops)  
 (for Chronology of Bishops) 

17th-century Roman Catholic bishops in Cuba
Bishops appointed by Pope Clement X
1621 births
1676 deaths
Roman Catholic bishops of Santiago de Cuba